Mats Wilander successfully defended his title, by defeating Guillermo Vilas 6–0, 6–3, 6–1 in the final. Vilas completed his 4th consecutive year as runner-up.

Seeds

Draw

Finals

Top half

Section 1

Section 2

Bottom half

Section 3

Section 4

References

External links
 Official results archive (ATP)
 Official results archive (ITF)

1983 Grand Prix (tennis)